Post-Keynesian economics is a school of economic thought with its origins in The General Theory of John Maynard Keynes, with subsequent development influenced to a large degree by Michał Kalecki, Joan Robinson, Nicholas Kaldor, Sidney Weintraub, Paul Davidson, Piero Sraffa and Jan Kregel. Historian Robert Skidelsky argues that the post-Keynesian school has remained closest to the spirit of Keynes' original work. It is a heterodox approach to economics.

Introduction
The term "post-Keynesian" was first used to refer to a distinct school of economic thought by Eichner and Kregel (1975) and by the establishment of the Journal of Post Keynesian Economics in 1978. Prior to 1975, and occasionally in more recent work, post-Keynesian could simply mean economics carried out after 1936, the date of Keynes's General Theory.

Post-Keynesian economists are united in maintaining that Keynes' theory is seriously misrepresented by the two other principal Keynesian schools: neo-Keynesian economics, which was orthodox in the 1950s and 60s, and new Keynesian economics, which together with various strands of neoclassical economics has been dominant in mainstream macroeconomics since the 1980s. Post-Keynesian economics can be seen as an attempt to rebuild economic theory in the light of Keynes' ideas and insights. However, even in the early years, post-Keynesians such as Joan Robinson sought to distance themselves from Keynes, and much current post-Keynesian thought cannot be found in Keynes. Some post-Keynesians took a more progressive view than Keynes himself, with greater emphases on worker-friendly policies and redistribution. Robinson, Paul Davidson and Hyman Minsky emphasized the effects on the economy of practical differences between different types of investments, in contrast to Keynes' more abstract treatment.

The theoretical foundation of post-Keynesian economics is the principle of effective demand, that demand matters in the long as well as the short run, so that a competitive market economy has no natural or automatic tendency towards full employment. Contrary to the views of new Keynesian economists working in the neoclassical tradition, post-Keynesians do not accept that the theoretical basis of the market's failure to provide full employment is rigid or sticky prices or wages. Post-Keynesians typically reject the IS–LM model of John Hicks, which is very influential in neo-Keynesian economics, because they argue endogenous bank lending to be more significant than central banks' money supply for the interest rate.

The contribution of post-Keynesian economics has extended beyond the theory of aggregate employment to theories of income distribution, growth, trade and development in which money demand plays a key role, whereas in neoclassical economics these are determined by the forces of technology, preferences and endowment. In the field of monetary theory, post-Keynesian economists were among the first to emphasise that money supply responds to the demand for bank credit, so that a central bank cannot control the quantity of money, but only manage the interest rate by managing the quantity of monetary reserves.

This view has largely been incorporated into mainstream economics and monetary policy, which now targets the interest rate as an instrument, rather than attempting to accurately control the quantity of money. In the field of finance, Hyman Minsky put forward a theory of financial crisis based on financial fragility, which has received renewed attention.

Main features 
In 2009 Marc Lavoie listed the main features of post-Keynesian economics:

 Effective demand 
 Historical and dynamic time

He also lists 5 auxiliary features:

 The possible negative impact of flexible prices
 The monetary production of the economy
 Fundamental uncertainty 
 Relevant and contemporary microeconomics
 Pluralism of theories and methods

Strands 
There are a number of strands to post-Keynesian theory with different emphases. Joan Robinson regarded Michał Kalecki's theory of effective demand to be superior to Keynes' theories. Kalecki's theory is based on a class division between workers and capitalists and imperfect competition. Robinson also led the critique of the use of aggregate production functions based on homogeneous capital – the Cambridge capital controversy – winning the argument but not the battle. The writings of Piero Sraffa were a significant influence on the post-Keynesian position in this debate, though Sraffa and his neo-Ricardian followers drew more inspiration from David Ricardo than Keynes. Much of Nicholas Kaldor's work was based on the ideas of increasing returns to scale, path dependence, and the key differences between the primary and industrial sectors.

Paul Davidson follows Keynes closely in placing time and uncertainty at the centre of theory, from which flow the nature of money and of a monetary economy. Monetary circuit theory, originally developed in continental Europe, places particular emphasis on the distinctive role of money as means of payment. Each of these strands continues to see further development by later generations of economists.

Modern Monetary Theory is a relatively recent offshoot influenced by the macroeconomic modelling of Wynne Godley and Hyman Minsky's ideas on the labour market, as well as chartalism and functional finance.

Recent work in post-Keynesian economics has attempted to provide micro-foundations for capacity underutilization as a coordination failure (economics), justifying government intervention in the form of aggregate demand stimulus.

Current work

Journals 
Much post-Keynesian research is published in the Review of Keynesian Economics (ROKE), the Journal of Post Keynesian Economics (founded by Sidney Weintraub and  Paul Davidson), the Cambridge Journal of Economics, the Review of Political Economy, and the Journal of Economic Issues (JEI).

United Kingdom 
There is also a United Kingdom academic association, the Post-Keynesian Economics Society (PKES). It was founded by Philip Arestis and Victoria Chick in 1988 as the Post-Keynesian Economics Study Group (PKSG) and changed its name in 2018. In the UK, post-Keynesian economists can be found in:
 SOAS University of London
 University of Greenwich
 University of Leeds
 Kingston University
 King's College London, International Political Economy
 Goldsmiths, University of London
 University of the West of England, Bristol 
 University of Hertfordshire
 Cambridge University, Land Economy 
 Birmingham City University
 University College London, Institute for Innovation and Public Purpose
 Open University
 University of Winchester

United States 
In the United States, there are several universities with a post-Keynesian bent:
 The New School, New York City
 The University of Massachusetts Amherst
 The University of Utah, Salt Lake City
 Bucknell University, Lewisburg, Pennsylvania
 Denison University, Granville, Ohio
 Levy Economics Institute at Bard College, Annandale-on-Hudson, New York
 University of Missouri–Kansas City
 University of Denver
 Colorado State University, Fort Collins
 The University of Massachusetts Boston
 John Jay College of Criminal Justice at City University of New York, New York City

Netherlands 
 Erasmus University, Rotterdam
 International Institute of Social Studies, The Hague
 University of Groningen, Groningen

France 
Sorbonne Paris North University

Canada 

In Canada, post-Keynesians can be found at the University of Ottawa and Laurentian University.

Germany 

In Germany, post-Keynesianism is very strong at the Berlin School of Economics and Law and its master's degree courses: International Economics [M.A.] and Political Economomy of European Integration [M.A.]. Many German Post-Keynesians are organized in the Forum Macroeconomics and Macroeconomic Policies.

Australia

University of Newcastle 
The University of Newcastle in New South Wales, Australia, houses the post-Keynesian think-tank the Centre of Full Employment and Equity (CofFEE).

Major post-Keynesian economists

Major post-Keynesian economists of the first and second generations after Keynes include:

 Victoria Chick
 Alfred Eichner
 James Crotty
 Paul Davidson
 Wynne Godley
 Geoff Harcourt
 Donald J. Harris
 Michael Hudson
 Nicholas Kaldor
 Michał Kalecki
 Frederic S. Lee
 Augusto Graziani
 Steve Keen
 Jan Kregel
 Marc Lavoie
 Paolo Leon
 Abba P. Lerner
 Hyman Minsky
 Basil Moore
 Edward J. Nell
 Luigi Pasinetti
 Joan Robinson
 George Shackle
 Anthony Thirlwall
 Fernando Vianello
 William Vickrey
 L. Randall Wray
 Dimitri B. Papadimitriou
 Sidney Weintraub

See also
 Disequilibrium macroeconomics
 Endogenous money
 Job guarantee
 Keynesian economics
 Neo-Keynesian economics
 New Keynesian economics

Notes

References

Further reading
 
 Holt, Ric; Pressman, Steven (2006). Empirical Post Keynesian Economics: Looking at the Real World. M.E. Sharpe.

External links
 Structure of Post Keynesian Economics-Geoff Harcourt
 William Vickrey -----Fifteen Fatal Fallacies of Financial Fundamentalism: A Disquisition on Demand Side Economics
 Presentation of post Keynesian economics Marc Lavoie 
 Samuelson and the Keynes/Post Keynesian Revolution:by Paul Davidson
Professor L. Randall Wray:Why The Federal Budget Is Not Like a Household Budget
Post-Keynesian economics: towards coherence Cambridge Journal of Economics

 
Keynesian economics